The women's discus throw event at the 1932 Olympic Games took place August 2.

Results

Final standings

Key: OR = Olympic record

References

Women's discus throw
Discus throw at the Olympics
1932 in women's athletics
Ath